Neozoarces is a genus of marine ray-finned fishes belonging to the family Stichaeidae, the pricklebacks and shannies. These fishes are found in the northwestern Pacific Ocean.

Species
 the following species are classified within the genus Neozoarces:

References

Neozoarcinae
Taxa described in 1880
Taxa named by Franz Steindachner
Fish genera